Pterocerina trifasciata is a species of ulidiid or picture-winged fly in the genus Pterocerina of the family Ulidiidae.

References

trifasciata
Insects described in 1909